Petaling may refer to:
Petaling, Selangor, a district in Selangor, Malaysia
Petaling (federal constituency), formerly represented in the Dewan Rakyat (1974–86)
Petaling Jaya, a city in Selangor, Malaysia
Petaling Street, a Chinatown located in Kuala Lumpur, Malaysia
 A subdistrict (mukim) of Petaling District within township Majlis Perbandaran Subang Jaya.

See also
Petaling Jaya (disambiguation)